Miloslav Netušil (born 20 February 1946) is a Czech gymnast. He competed at the 1968 Summer Olympics, the 1972 Summer Olympics and the 1976 Summer Olympics.

References

1946 births
Living people
Czech male artistic gymnasts
Olympic gymnasts of Czechoslovakia
Gymnasts at the 1968 Summer Olympics
Gymnasts at the 1972 Summer Olympics
Gymnasts at the 1976 Summer Olympics
Sportspeople from Chomutov